Union Grove may refer to:

 Union Grove Township, Whiteside County, Illinois
 Union Grove Township, Meeker County, Minnesota
 Union Grove Township, Iredell County, North Carolina

Township name disambiguation pages